John Duncan may refer to:

Arts and entertainment
 John Duncan (painter) (1866–1945), Scottish painter
 John Duncan (artist) (born 1953), American artist and musician
 Big John Duncan (born 1958), Scottish punk musician
 John Duncan (harpist) (1904–1998), English musician

Law, military, and politics
 John Duncan (Australian politician) (1845–1913), South Australian pastoralist and politician
 John Duncan (Canadian politician) (born 1948), MP from British Columbia
 John Duncan (New Zealand politician) (1848–1924), New Zealand politician
 John Edward Duncan (1884–1959), member of the New Zealand Legislative Council
 John Duncan (US Administration) (born 1945), U.S. Department of the Treasury
 John Riley Duncan (1850–1911), Texas lawman
 John Duncan Sr. (1919–1988), U.S. Representative from Tennessee
 John S. R. Duncan (1921–2006), British administrator in Sudan, then diplomat, high commissioner and ambassador
 Jimmy Duncan (politician) (John James Duncan, Jr., born 1947), U.S. Representative from Tennessee, son of John Duncan, Sr., above
 John Duncan (diplomat) (born 1958), British diplomat, ambassador for Multilateral Arms Control and Disarmament 2006–11
 John Alton Duncan (1932–2007), Manitoba judge
 John Duncan (British Army officer, born 1872) (1872–1948), British general
 John Duncan (British Army officer, born 1870) (1870–1960), British general

Religion
 John Duncan, a.k.a. John Dongan (fl. c. 1410), Manx religious leader
 John Duncan (writer) (1721–1808), English miscellaneous writer and army chaplain
 John Duncan (theologian) (1796–1870), aka Rabbi Duncan, Scottish religious leader and educator
 John Duncan (priest) (born 1933), English Archdeacon of Birmingham from 1985 to 2001

Sports
 Art Duncan (John Arthur Duncan, 1891–1975), Canadian ice hockey player
 John Ross Duncan (born 1944), Australian cricketer
 John Duncan (footballer) (1949–2022), Scottish football player and manager
 John William Duncan (1885–1963), Welsh field hockey player

Others
 John Duncan (author), American writer
 John Duncan (botanist) (1794–1881), Scottish weaver and botanist
 John Duncan (neuroscientist), (born 1953), British neuroscientist
 John Duncan (surgeon) (1839–1899), Scottish surgeon, President of the Royal College of Surgeons of Edinburgh
 John Duncan (weaver), Scottish writer on weaving
 John Duncan (traveller in Africa) (1805–1849), Scottish traveller in Africa
 John Charles Duncan, American astronomer
 John H. Duncan (1855–1929), American architect
 John Holt Duncan (1820–1896), one of eight founders of Beta Theta Pi, a college fraternity at Miami University
 John S. Duncan (born 1955), British neurologist

Johnny Duncan 
 Johnny Duncan (actor) (1923–2016), American actor
 Johnny Duncan (bluegrass musician) (1931–2000), American skiffle and bluegrass musician
 Johnny Duncan (country singer) (1938–2006), American country-music singer
 Johnny Duncan (footballer) (1896–1966), Scottish football player and manager associated with Leicester City

See also
 Jon Duncan (born 1975), British orienteering world champion
 Jack Duncan (disambiguation)
 Jonathan Duncan (disambiguation)